Jeff Price is the current head coach at Lynn University. He had previously served as the interim head men's basketball coach at South Alabama and Price went to USA after a one-year stint as the head coach at West Virginia Wesleyan College. The Bobcats earned just their second-ever NCAA Tournament appearance in Price's first season. 
 
Price was the head coach at Georgia Southern University previously. Price resigned after winning 165 games in 10 seasons. Under Price, the Eagles recorded three 20-win seasons and returned to post-season play after a 14-year absence in 2006 with a berth in the NIT. Price's first head coaching job came at Lynn University.

Price was appointed the interim head coach of the South Alabama Jaguars on December 19, 2012, succeeding Ronnie Arrow, who abruptly retired.

References

1959 births
Living people
American men's basketball coaches
Basketball coaches from Ohio
Basketball players from Ohio
Georgia Southern Eagles men's basketball coaches
Junior college men's basketball players in the United States
Lynn Fighting Knights men's basketball coaches
Pikeville Bears men's basketball players
South Alabama Jaguars men's basketball coaches
Washington Huskies men's basketball coaches
American men's basketball players